Sveti Juraj na Bregu is a municipality in Međimurje County, Croatia.

The municipality consists of 9 villages: Brezje, Dragoslavec, Frkanovec, Lopatinec, Mali Mihaljevec, Okrugli Vrh, Pleškovec, Vučetinec and Zasadbreg. The municipality covers an area of 30,17 km², while its population in the 2011 census was 5,090. The majority of the population are Croats.

The official seat of the municipality is Lopatinec, with the church of St. George which is visible from a huge distance, village also includes the municipality's elementary school and the main church of the local parish. In the 19th century, the present villages of Dragoslavec, Frkanovec, Lopatinec, Okrugli Vrh, Pleškovec and Vučetinec were considered a single village under the present name of the municipality - Sveti Juraj na Bregu.

The municipality was named after Saint George, who is also depicted on its coat of arms. Its name means Saint George on the Hill in the local dialect.

The main road going through the municipality connects Čakovec, the county seat of Međimurje County, with Štrigova and the Croatian-Slovenian border checkpoint in Razkrižje.

The main church of the local parish sits atop of a hill and is one of the most prominent churches in the region, as it is also visible from the D3 state road while driving from Varaždin in the direction of Čakovec. In 2008, it was heavily damaged when its bell tower collapsed during renovations, but has since been rebuilt.

Gallery

Famous people 
Vinko Kos, Croatian author, poet and children's writer

References

External links

 

Municipalities of Croatia
Populated places in Međimurje County